The Gangani (Γαγγανοι) were a people of ancient Ireland who are referred to in Ptolemy's 2nd century Geography as living in the south-west of the island, probably near the mouth of the River Shannon, between the Auteini to the north and the Uellabori to the south. There appears to have been a people of the same name in north-west Wales, as Ptolemy calls the Llŷn Peninsula the "promontory of the Gangani" (Γαγγανὤν ἄκρον).

See also
 Conganchnes mac Dedad, a name of perhaps some relation. Cú Roí, Conganchnes' nephew, was based in Irish legend not far from the Gangani.

References

Medieval Ireland
Prehistoric Ireland
Tribes of ancient Ireland